is a Japanese television program produced by Tsuburaya Productions that aired from 1977 to 1978 on TV Tokyo. It combined Tsuburaya's trademark suitmation tokusatsu techniques with anime. The show ran for 39 episodes.

Plot

Dinosaurs reappear on Earth, stronger and more intelligent than before, led by Ururu (renamed Tyrannis in the English dub), and this time they are trying to rule Earth once more and wipe out humankind. They are alive and even thriving in an underground empire that they have built.

In 1986, Satan Gottes, the leader of the dinosaurs, declares war against humanity. In an attempt to reclaim Earth's surface, some of the dinosaurs evolve into deadly monsters and start wreaking havoc on human population centers around the globe.

The story revolves around the D-Force (D戦隊 D Sentai), and its two members, a brother and sister team of Tachibana Ai (立花 愛) and Tachibana Zen (立花 善), the Special OPs force, whose mission is to combat monsterized dinosaurs and protect humanity. But early in the series, the siblings suffer a near-fatal injury from the massive explosion during the test of a prototype super-tank, "predecessor to Izenborg".

In order to keep them alive, they receive cybernetic body parts and other implants, which synchronize with their combat vehicle and form Aizenborg (Ai + Zen + Cy"borg"; called Gemini in the US version) to fight the dino-army. Halfway through the show their bodies are altered again, and the two are able to combine into a robotic giant that can fight the dinosaurs in close combat.

Compilation film
On 25 August 1982, the first four episodes were released to VHS in the United States in the form of a compilation film titled Attack of the Super Monsters.

Comedy podcast RiffTrax (Michael J. Nelson, Bill Corbett and Kevin Murphy) recorded and released a riff in 2019. The original, unriffed version is available on IMDb TV and Tubi.

The Return of Izenborg
 is a Japanese-Arabic documentary produced as a collaboration between the Japanese company Tsuburaya Productions, Mr. Jarrah Alfurih from Saudi Arabia and Cultures Factory (an NLC company). It is the first Arabic-Japanese production in the art of Japanese tokusatsu, which is a special live action effects category. This documentary was filmed in 2016 and aired on Friday December 15, 2017 on the Arabic channel Spacetoon at 8:30pm local Saudi time. The documentary was translated back to Japanese by Tsubaraya and officially streamed on YouTube on December 29, 2017.

References

External links 

1977 anime television series debuts
1977 Japanese television series debuts
1978 Japanese television series endings
Dinosaurs in anime and manga
Mecha anime and manga
Animated television series about dinosaurs
Tokusatsu television series
Tsuburaya Productions
Studio Deen
TV Tokyo original programming
Ultra television series 
Television series set in 1986
Japanese television series with live action and animation